The 2021 VMI Keydets football team represented the Virginia Military Institute in the 2021 NCAA Division I FCS football season as a member of the Southern Conference (SoCon). The Keydets were led by seventh-year head coach Scott Wachenheim and played their home games at Alumni Memorial Field in Lexington, Virginia.

Schedule

References

VMI
VMI Keydets football seasons
VMI Keydets football